Carrot top may refer to:

Relating to people and persons
 A generally disparaging term for someone with red hair (see: Discrimination against people with red hair)
 William Wells (soldier) (1770 – 1812), United States Army officer
 Carrot Top, stage name of American comedian Scott Thompson
 Carrot Topp, the lead singer for comedy punk band The Radioactive Chicken Heads

Other uses
 carrot greens, the top of a carrot
 Poil de carotte, 1894 short story by Jules Renard

See also

 parsley, the greens of a carrot-relative, parsley-root vegetable
 
 Carrot (disambiguation)
 Top (disambiguation)